The UFAG C.I was a military reconnaissance aircraft produced in the Austro-Hungarian Empire during World War I, by the Ungarische Flugzeugfabrik Abteil Gesellschaft (UFAG) . It was introduced in April 1918, and was widely used on the Italian Front in the final months of World War I.

The UFAG C.I incorporated the best features of the Brandenburg C.II(U) with single-bay wings and 'I' strut inter-plane bracing, which was replaced wing conventional steel-tube interplane struts in production aircraft. More manoeuvrable than the Phönix C.I, the C.I had good performance, but suffered from a few odd handling characteristics.

Production of the C.I continued after the Armistice by MARE and was also built by the Neuschloss-Lichtig factory as the NL Sportplane.

Variants
Data from:Austro-Hungarian Army Aircraft of World War One
UFAG 161.01First prototype  span,  Hiero 6, 'I' type inter-plane struts.
UFAG 161.02Second prototype,  Hiero 6, 'I' type inter-plane struts.
UFAG C.I  (series 161.03 to 161.22) Production by Ufag,  span,  Hiero 6, twin inter-plane struts.
UFAG C.I  (series 161.31 to 161.250) Production by Ufag,  span,  Hiero 6, twin inter-plane struts.
UFAG C.I(Ph) (series 123.01 to 123.40) Production by Phönix,  span,  Hiero 6, twin inter-plane struts.
UFAG 60.01 an improved C.I which would evolve into the UFAG 60.03 / C.II.

Operational history
The C.I was widely used by the KuKLFT on the Italian front by at least 30 Fliks. The C.I was also used post WWI by the Hungarian Red Airborne Corps as well as the clandestine Hungarian Legügyi Hivatal. Ex-military C.Is were also converted for civil use and as mailplanes.

Royal Yugoslav Air Force - Postwar.

Romanian Air Corps - 20 UFAG C.I captured from the Hungarian Soviet Republic in 1919.

Specifications (C.I second series 161.23 - 161.250)

References

1910s Austro-Hungarian military reconnaissance aircraft
Biplanes
Single-engined tractor aircraft
Aircraft first flown in 1918